The New York Excelsior (often stylized as NYXL) is an American professional Overwatch esports team based in New York City, New York. The Excelsior compete in the Overwatch League (OWL) as a member of the league's West region. Founded in 2017, the team is one of twelve founding members of the Overwatch League and is the first professional esports team to represent the city of New York. The franchise is owned by NYXL, which was founded under the name Andbox by venture capital fund Sterling.VC, supported by Sterling Equities. They also own XL2 Academy, an academy team for NYXL that competed in Overwatch Contenders.

Hyun-sang "Pavane" Yu was appointed the team's first head coach and led New York to two conference titles, all seven midseason tournament playoff appearances, midseason tournament titles, and a two-season playoff berths in his time from 2018 to 2019. NYXL missed the season playoffs for the first time in franchise history in the 2021 season.

Franchise history

Beginnings 
On July 12, 2017, Overwatch developer Activision Blizzard officially announced that Jeff Wilpon, co-founder and partner of Sterling.VC, purchased the New York-based Overwatch League franchise for an estimated $20 million. With the purchase, the franchise became the first professional esports team to represent New York City. "We sort of skirted around it in the periphery, looked at a couple of teams, made a couple of investments in some companies that do work within esports but never had the real opportunity to buy a team like this," Wilpon said in an interview. "Knowing how committed Activision Blizzard is in this space, it made sense to come in. With people like the Krafts involved, it just gave a good feeling to this."

On October 30, the franchise revealed they would be called the New York Excelsior, as well as unveiling their team branding and inaugural season roster. The roster would entail the acquisitions of the complete LuxuryWatch Blue team, LuxuryWatch Red's Hong "Ark" Yeon-jun and coaches Yu "Pavane" Hyun-sang and Kim "WizardHyeong" Hyeong-seok, and Meta Athena's Kim "Libero" Hae-seong.

JJonak era: 2018–2021 

The Excelsior first OWL regular season match was on January 11, 2018, and resulted in a 3–1 win over the Boston Uprising. They ended Stage 1 of the 2018 season with a  record, earning them the top spot and first-round bye in the Stage 1 Playoffs. However, the team lost in the finals to the London Spitfire, 3–2. Stage 2 played out much like Stage 1 for New York, as the team went on to post again a 9–1 record and a first-round bye into the Stage 2 Playoffs. New York defeated the Philadelphia Fusion, 3–2, on March 25 to claim their first midseason tournament title. In Stage 3, New York once again posted a 9–1 record, giving them the second seed for the Stage 3 Playoffs. The team won in the Stage 3 finals against Boston Uprising by a score of 3–0, giving New York back-to-back midseason tournament titles. New York posted their worst record, 7–3, in Stage 4, but still claimed the third seed for the Stage 4 Playoffs. They lost in the Stage 4 finals against the Los Angeles Valiant by a score of 1–3. New York ended their 2018 season with a league-best 34–6 record and qualified for a first-round bye into the season playoffs. The team's first playoff opponent was the Philadelphia Fusion in the semifinals on July 18 and 21. New York lost both matchups by scores of 0–3 and 2–3, eliminating them from the playoffs. Support player Bang "JJonak" Seong-hyun was won the league's regular season Most Valuable Player award.

New York began their 2019 season with a perfect 7–0 record in Stage 1, giving them the top seed in the Atlantic Division for the Stage 1 playoffs; however, the team lost 1–3 to the Seoul Dynasty quarterfinals. NYXL posted a 5–2 record for Stage 2 and claimed the fifth seed for the Stage 2 Playoffs, but they lost in the semifinals to the Vancouver Titans by a score of 1–4. Another perfect 7–0 record in Stage 3 gave New York the top seed in the Stage 3 playoffs; however, team failed to claim the stage title, as they fell 1–3 to the Shanghai Dragons in the quarterfinals. Following a 3–1 victory over the Paris Eternal on August 2, the Excelsior clinched the second seed – and the top seed in the Atlantic Division – in the 2019 playoffs. The team finished the regular season with a 22–6 record. NYXL opened their playoffs with a 4–1 win over the London Spitfire on September 6. For their next match, they took down the Atlanta Reign, 4–2, and advanced to the winners' finals, where they faced the Vancouver Titans. A 3–4 loss to the Titans dropped New York to the lower bracket of the tournament. The Excelsior's playoff run ended in the lower bracket finals, as they were defeated by the San Francisco Shock, 0–4.

In the offseason preceding the 2020 season, head coach Yu "Pavane" Hyun-sang left for the Philadelphia Fusion, and NYXL promoted assistant coach Jeong "IMT" Yong-cheol to head coach. The Excelsior opened the 2020 season on February 8, 2020, hosting the league's first homestand, a hybrid model of the home-and-away structure seen in traditional sports, of the season at the sold-out Hammerstein Ballroom in New York. After a 5–1 start to the season, the Excelsior, and the entire league, ceased play due to the COVID-19 pandemic and shifted to an online play format. With large number of outbreaks in New York State, the team decided to relocate to South Korea, where they would be competing in the league's newly formed Asia region thereafter. After a 10–3 record through the regular season, NYXL signed 2019 Rookie of the Year Kim "Haksal" Hyo-jong. New York finished the regular season with a 16–8, including bonus wins, and qualified for the season playoffs; however, their they were eliminated after a loss to the Seoul Dynasty.

Heading into the 2021 season, the Excelsior released their entire roster, aside from JJonak, and signed a team consisting of mostly rookies from Korean Overwatch Contenders teams. Additionally, New York promoted Lee "WhyNot" Ju-hyeop to head coach. New York stayed in South Korea, competing in the league's Eastern region, formerly known as the Asia region. The team had their worst season in franchise history, finishing in sixth place in the East region with a 7–9 regular season record and missing out on the season playoffs.

2022–present 
For the 2022 season, the Excelsior returned to New York to compete in the league's Western division. New York dropped almost all of their entire roster ahead of the 2022 season, including their starting support player for the previous four seasons JJonak. NYXL signed several veterans players, one rookie player, and signed former RunAway coach Kim "KuKi" Dae-kuk in the offseason.

Team identity 
The franchise's name is based on the New York state motto, Excelsior, which means 'ever upward' in Latin. The motto was selected for embodying the team's commitment to "reaching the top and never letting up". It and its abbreviation XL, also represent the endless ambition of ever-growing New York City at its most powerful.

Unique as the only flag-based logo in the Overwatch League, the logo symbolizes the coming together of people, cultures, and ideas. The lines and shapes featured on the flag are also representative of New York specific things, such as the subway systems, skylines, and grid of the city.

Sponsors 
New York Excelsior currently has two partnerships. In November 2018, New York Excelsior partnered with Raynor Gaming as its official gaming chair partner. In February 2019, New York Excelsior partnered with telecommunications brand T-Mobile as a new sponsor.

Personnel

Current roster

Head coaches

Awards and records

Seasons overview

Individual accomplishments 
Season MVP
JJonak (Bang Seong-hyun) – 2018

Role Stars selections
Mano (Kim Dong-gyu) – 2019

All-Star Game selections
Ark (Hong Yeon-jun) – 2018
Libero (Kim Hae-seong) – 2018
Saebyeolbe (Park Jong-ryeol) – 2018
JJonak (Bang Seong-hyun) – 2018, 2019, 2020
Mano (Kim Dong-gyu) – 2018, 2019, 2020
Meko (Kim Tae-hong) – 2018, 2019
Pine (Kim Do-hyeon) – 2018, 2019
Anamo (Jung Tae-Sung) – 2019
Nenne (Jeong Yeon-Gwan) – 2019
Haksal (Kim Hyo-jung) – 2020

All-Star Game head coaches
Pavane (Yu Hyun-sang) – 2018, 2019

Academy team 

On February 20, 2018, the Excelsior formally announced their academy team would go under the name XL2 Academy for Overwatch Contenders North America, as well as revealing their initial 6-player squad.

References

External links 

 

 
Esports teams based in the United States
Overwatch League teams
2017 establishments in New York City
Esports teams established in 2017
Venture capital-funded esports teams